Wendling railway station was a railway station in Wendling, Norfolk on the Great Eastern line between Dereham and King's Lynn. It closed in 1968.

This section of the former railway has been used for improvements to the A47, with the site of the station being lost under the roadworks.

The station featured in the Dad's Army episodes Battle School and The Day the Balloon Went Up.

References

External links
 Wendling station on 1946 O. S. map

Disused railway stations in Norfolk
Former Great Eastern Railway stations
Railway stations in Great Britain opened in 1848
Railway stations in Great Britain closed in 1968
1848 establishments in England
1968 disestablishments in England